Angel Citizens is a 1922 American silent Western film directed by Francis Ford and starring Franklyn Farnum, Peggy O'Day and Shorty Hamilton.

Plot 
"Angel City is a misnomer. A gang of outlaws is largely in control and when Isabelle Bruner's father is mysteriously killed the sheriff decides to get busy.  Frank Bartlett, an idler who could afford to be idle, appeared in town and took Isabelle to the country ball.  In search of a new thrill, he decides to aid the sheriff, and the first thing he does is to scare away the would-be robbers of the stagecoach.  This is only the beginning of a dramatic career which ends in his bringing home the honors, and winning the girl."

--Moving Picture World

Cast
 Franklyn Farnum as Frank Bartlett
 Al Hart as London Edwards
 Shorty Hamilton as 'Smoky' Nivette
 Peggy O'Day as Isabelle Bruner
 Max Hoffman as The Doctor
 Terris Hoffman as His Wife

References

External links
 

1922 films
1922 Western (genre) films
Films directed by Francis Ford
Silent American Western (genre) films
1920s English-language films
1920s American films